Nawab Faizunnesa Government Girls' High School is a girls' school in Comilla, Bangladesh, established in 1873 by Faizunnesa Choudhurani, who would in 1889 be titled India's only female nawab by Queen Victoria. Faizunnesa, a wealthy zamindar, established Faizunnesa Girls' Pilot High School, having noted the need for female education which would accommodate Muslim girls practising purdah. The school taught its children in the local Bengali language rather than Urdu or Persian which were the standard languages of education at the time. The students also learned English. During the early years of its establishment, it was treated as the English medium school for girls. It was converted to a junior high school in 1889, and to a high school in 1931.

Notable alumni 
 Bidya Sinha Saha Mim - renowned Bangladeshi actress.
 Santi Ghose, Indian nationalist

References

External links
 School page on Facebook

Schools in Comilla District
Girls' schools in Bangladesh
High schools in Bangladesh
1873 establishments in India
Educational institutions established in 1873